Flathead Valley Community College is a public community college in Kalispell, Montana.

History 
The college was founded in 1967. It is one of three two-year institutions in the state that are outside the control of the University of Montana System, Montana State University System, and the tribal college system. The school offers an Associate of Applied Science degree in 24 different majors, as well as an Associate in Arts degree for substance abuse counseling and an Associate in Science degree for nursing. The college added an AAS degree in Brewing Science and Brewery Operations in 2015, and has built an on-campus brewery for student instruction.  Student housing will be available for the first time during the 2017–2018 academic year.

Administration 
The college is governed by an elected board of trustees. The president is appointed by the board to administer the operations of the institution. The current president is Jane A. Karas.

Notable people 
 Frank Garner, law enforcement officer and member of the Montana House of Representatives
Braxton Mitchell, member of the Montana House of Representatives (no degree)

References

External links
Official website

Brewing
Universities and colleges accredited by the Northwest Commission on Colleges and Universities
1967 establishments in Montana
Community colleges in Montana